Pheasant Lane Mall, occupying , is one of the largest shopping malls in the state of New Hampshire and the focal point of the commercial area in south Nashua. 

Since 2012 it has been owned and managed by Simon Property Group of Indianapolis. 

Located just south of Exit 1 of the F.E. Everett Turnpike/U.S. Route 3 in Nashua and directly at northbound exit-only Exit 91 (Old Exit 36) off  US 3 in Tyngsborough, Massachusetts, the property straddles the state line, although the entire mall is in New Hampshire.  

Proximity to the border has long drawn shoppers from Massachusetts seeking to take advantage of New Hampshire's lack of a sales tax. 

Approximately one third of the parking lot and water runoff area is located in Tyngsborough. Shoppers who park in front of the former Sears entrance closer to Buffalo Wild Wings walk across the state line in front of the building on the sidewalk to get to and from their cars. The JCPenney store was originally built with a square corner that reached slightly across the border into Massachusetts, but was then modified to an unusual pentagonal shape at the state line to keep it entirely within New Hampshire by a few inches. Without that modification, the entire mall would have been subject to Massachusetts sales taxes on non-clothing items, even though only a few inches of the structure was in Massachusetts.

History
The mall site was first re-zoned by the Nashua Board of Aldermen in December 1978 with the intention of clearing the way for primary owners Yankee Greyhound Inc. to build a major regional retail center on the site.  By early 1984, the property was owned by State Properties of New England, previously a minority owner; ground work had been started and steel had been ordered.  After more than two years of construction, Pheasant Lane Mall opened on July 23, 1986. The original anchors were JCPenney, Jordan Marsh, Lechmere, and Sears with Filene's added in 1993. The site was previously a drive-in movie theatre, and for several years following its opening, the former movie screen was used to display the double pheasant logo of the mall. 

The resulting mall development transformed South Nashua. It turned the southeastern portion of the city, roughly conforming to the city's 8th ward, from a sparsely populated outlier area into a swath of financial, retail and high-density residential development that stretches from over the state border in Tyngsborough, Massachusetts, to Exit 3 of the Everett Turnpike, just south of Rivier College. The rise of South Nashua spurred by Pheasant Lane Mall has elevated Nashua's municipal identity beyond gateway to New Hampshire, and helped create its current status as part of the Greater Boston economic area, and a hub for surrounding bedroom communities.

The nature of building on a border between a state with no sales tax (New Hampshire) and a state with one (Massachusetts) was shown in the changing plans and problems. Originally, the mall was to straddle the border, with retail on the no-sales-tax side. Restaurants were to be on the opposite end, since Massachusetts has a lower meals tax. However, the government of Massachusetts declared all customers, in all stores, would have to pay sales tax to Massachusetts. Therefore, the mall was redesigned so that all stores and restaurants were on the New Hampshire side of the border. 

However, the site lines had been drawn up incorrectly, placing one corner of the JCPenney building in Massachusetts. Consequently, the corner of JCPenney was cut off and re-bricked into its current pentagonal shape.

The Jordan Marsh location was occupied in spring 1996 by Macy's, which then moved in early 2006 into the space formerly taken by Filene's when Macy's was merged with Filene's. The original Jordan Marsh location in the mall is now occupied by Dick's Sporting Goods, restaurants Burtons Grill and Red Robin, and Shops Visionworks and Massage Envy Spa. Lechmere closed in fall 1997 and was rebuilt into the Target store in fall 1999.

In 2011, Pheasant Lane underwent a $10 million renovation that included a redesign of the food court, new lighting and fixtures, ceramic tiles and carpeting, as well as an expansion to the number of retailers and restaurants. The renovations were finished by September 2012.

In 2015, Sears Holdings spun off 235 of its properties, including the Sears at Pheasant Lane Mall, into Seritage Growth Properties.

On November 7, 2019, it was announced that Sears would be closing as part of a plan to close 96 stores nationwide. The store closed on February 2, 2020.

See also
Nashua Transit System

References

External links
Pheasant Lane Mall website

Buildings and structures in Nashua, New Hampshire
Simon Property Group
Shopping malls in New Hampshire
Tourist attractions in Nashua, New Hampshire
Shopping malls established in 1986
1986 establishments in New Hampshire